World Theatre Festival may refer to:

World Theatre Festival (Brisbane), held in Brisbane, Australia, from 2010 to 2015
World Theatre Festival (Carnumtum), held in an ancient amphitheatre near the village of Petronell-Carnuntum, Austria, since around 1988
World Theatre Festival (Denver), held in Denver, Colorado, US, in 1982
World Theatre Festival (Shizuoka), held in Shizuoko city, Japan, ongoing
World Theatre Festival (Zagreb), held in Zagreb, Croatia, since 2003

See also
International Theater Festival (Baltimore), held in Baltimore, Connecticut, US, in 1981
Old World Theatre Festival, held at the India Habitat Centre in Delhi, India
World Festival of Children's Theatre, based in Lingen (Ems), Germany